Daraki may refer to:
 Daraki, Kurdistan
 Daraki, South Khorasan